Karl Leander Ikonen (14 October 1860, in Joroinen – 27 April 1918, in Viipuri) was a Finnish architect and politician. He was a member of the Parliament of Finland from 1916 to 1917, representing the Finnish Party. In 1918, during the Finnish Civil War, being a prominent supporter of the White side, he was arrested by Red Guards and shot in Viipuri on 27 April 1918, as White troops were preparing to storm the city.

References

1860 births
1918 deaths
People from Joroinen
People from Mikkeli Province (Grand Duchy of Finland)
Finnish Party politicians
Members of the Parliament of Finland (1916–17)
Finnish architects
People of the Finnish Civil War (White side)
Deaths by firearm in Finland